F. Murray Fraser,  (April 18, 1937 – March 12, 1997) was a Canadian academic and University president.

Early life and education
Born in Liverpool, England, Fraser was raised in Nova Scotia. He received undergraduate degrees in Arts (1957) and Law (1960) from Dalhousie University and a Master's in Law (1962) from the University of London in the United Kingdom.

Career
He was made a Queen's Counsel in Nova Scotia in 1979. He taught law at Queen's University, Dalhousie University, University of Victoria and University of Calgary. He was the founding dean of the University of Victoria Faculty of Law. He was later appointed vice-president, academic of the University of Victoria. From 1988 to 1996, he was the president and vice-chancellor of the University of Calgary.

He received honorary degrees from Dalhousie, the University of Victoria and the Memorial University of Newfoundland.

Death
He died in 1997, of heart failure, at the age of 59.

References

1937 births
1997 deaths
Alumni of the University of London
Canadian university and college chief executives
Canadian university and college faculty deans
Dalhousie University alumni
English emigrants to Canada
Canadian King's Counsel
Academic staff of the Queen's University at Kingston
Academic staff of the Dalhousie University
Academic staff of the University of Victoria
Academic staff of the University of Calgary